James Miller was a Scottish footballer who played as an inside forward.

Miller played for Blantyre Victoria, Hamilton Academical, Queens Park Rangers, St Mirren, Morton, Grimsby Town, Manchester United, York City, Boston Town and Shirebrook.

References

Association football inside forwards
Blantyre Victoria F.C. players
Hamilton Academical F.C. players
St Mirren F.C. players
Greenock Morton F.C. players
Grimsby Town F.C. players
Manchester United F.C. players
Queens Park Rangers F.C. players
York City F.C. players
Boston Town F.C. (1920s) players
Shirebrook Miners Welfare F.C. players
Port Glasgow Athletic Juniors F.C. players
Midland Football League players
Footballers from Greenock
Scottish Football League players
Scottish Junior Football Association players
Southern Football League players
Scottish footballers
English Football League players
Year of birth missing
Year of death missing